La Cucaracha is the ninth and most recent studio album released by the American alternative rock band Ween. The album was available streaming on the band's MySpace page October 16–19, 2007, and it was released on October 23. It was named the 2007 Album of the Year by Magnet magazine. A bonus track, "Bag of Fat," was available as an iTunes exclusive with the purchase of the entire album.

On some versions of the album, "My Own Bare Hands" is titled "With My Own Bare Hands" and "Sweetheart" is titled "Sweetheart in the Summer".

Track listing
All tracks written by Gene Ween and Dean Ween.

Personnel

Ween
 Dean Ween
 Gene Ween
 Dave Dreiwitz
 Glenn McClelland
 Claude Coleman Jr.

Additional musicians
 Chuggy Carter
 David Sanborn
 Bunny Sigler
 Gloria Galante
 Debbie Richard
 Emma Kummrow
 Olga Konopelsky
 Igor Szwec
 Larry Gold
Production
 Andrew Weiss – production, engineering, mixing
 Dean Ween – assistant engineer
 Gabe Monago – quality control
 Howie Weinberg – mastering
 Aaron Tanner - art direction, design

Charts

References

External links
Ween Strikes Back With 'La Cucaracha'
Official Ween MySpace Page

2007 albums
Ween albums
Rounder Records albums